Vasyl Yakovlev (born 3 July 1972) is a Ukrainian former cyclist. He competed four Olympic Games.

References

External links
 

1972 births
Living people
Ukrainian male cyclists
Olympic cyclists of Ukraine
Olympic cyclists of the Unified Team
Cyclists at the 1992 Summer Olympics
Cyclists at the 1996 Summer Olympics
Cyclists at the 2000 Summer Olympics
Cyclists at the 2004 Summer Olympics
Sportspeople from Odesa